Abba Amona is a Kabbalistic mythological figure of the Judaic people. The duo are the divine couple vaunted in Kabbalah. The term translates to "Father-Mother".

References

Kabbalistic words and phrases